A calendar date is a reference to a particular day represented within a calendar system. The calendar date allows the specific day to be identified. The number of days between two dates may be calculated. For example, "25  " is ten days after "15  ". The date of a particular event depends on the observed time zone. For example, the air attack on Pearl Harbor that began at 7:48 a.m. Hawaiian time on 7 December 1941 took place at 3:18 a.m. Japan Standard Time, 8 December in Japan.

A particular day may be assigned a different nominal date according to the calendar used, so an identifying suffix may be needed where ambiguity may arise.  The Gregorian calendar is the world's most widely used civil calendar, and is designated (in English) as AD or CE. Many cultures use religious or regnal calendars such as the Gregorian (Western Christendom, AD), Hebrew calendar (Judaism, AM), the Hijri calendars (Islam, AH), Julian calendar (Eastern Christendom, AD) or any other of the many calendars used around the world. In most calendar systems, the date consists of three parts: the (numbered) day of the month, the month, and the (numbered) year. There may also be additional parts, such as the day of the week. Years are usually counted from a particular starting point, usually called the epoch, with era referring to the span of time since that epoch.

A date without the year may also be referred to as a date or calendar date (such as " " rather than "  "). As such, it is either shorthand for the current year or it defines the day of an annual event, such as a birthday on 31 May, a holiday on 1 September, or Christmas on 25 December.

Many computer systems internally store points in time in Unix time format or some other system time format.
The date (Unix) command—internally using the C date and time functions—can be used to convert that internal representation of a point in time to most of the date representations shown here.

Usage map

Date format

There is a large variety of formats for dates in use, which differ in the order of date components. These variations use the sample date of 31 May 2006: (e.g. 31/05/2006, 05/31/2006, 2006/05/31), component separators (e.g. 31.05.2006, 31/05/2006, 31-05-2006), whether leading zeros are included (e.g. 31/5/2006 vs. 31/05/2006), whether all four digits of the year are written (e.g., 31.05.2006 vs. 31.05.06), and whether the month is represented in Arabic or Roman numerals or by name  (e.g. 31.05.2006, 31.V.2006 vs. 31 May 2006).

Gregorian, day–month–year (DMY)  

This little-endian sequence is used by a majority of the world and is the preferred form by the United Nations when writing the full date format in official documents. This date format originates from the custom of writing the date as "the Nth day of [month] in the year of our Lord [year]" in Western religious and legal documents. The format has shortened over time but the order of the elements has remained constant. The following examples use the date of 9 November 2006. (With the years 2000–2009, care must be taken to ensure that two digit years do not intend to be 1900–1909 or other similar years.) The dots have a function of ordinal dot.

 "9 November 2006" or "9. November 2006" (the latter is common in German-speaking regions)
 9/11/2006 or 09/11/2006
 09.11.2006 or 9.11.2006
 9. 11. 2006
 9-11-2006 or 09-11-2006
 09-Nov-2006
 09Nov06 – Used, including in the U.S., where space needs to be saved by skipping punctuation (often seen on the dateline of Internet news articles).
 [The] 9th [of] November 2006 – 'The' and 'of' are often spoken but generally omitted in all but the most formal writing such as legal documents.
 09/Nov/2006 – used in the Common Log Format
 Thursday, 9 November 2006
 9/xi/06, 9.xi.06, 9-xi.06, 9/xi-06, 9.XI.2006, 9. XI. 2006 or 9 XI 2006 (using the Roman numeral for the month) – In the past, this was a common and typical way of distinguishing day from month and was widely used in many countries, but recently this practice has been affected by the general retreat from the use of Roman numerals. This is usually confined to handwriting only and is not put into any form of print. It is associated with a number of schools and universities. It has also been used by the Vatican as an alternative to using months named after Roman deities. It is used on Canadian postmarks as a bilingual form of the month. It was also commonly used in the Soviet Union, in both handwriting and print.
 9 November 2006 CE or 9 November 2006 AD

Gregorian, year–month–day (YMD) 

In this format, the most significant data item is written before lesser data items i.e. the year before the month before the day. It is consistent with the big-endianness of the Hindu–Arabic numeral system, which progresses from the highest to the lowest order magnitude. That is, using this format textual orderings and chronological orderings are identical. This form is standard in East Asia, Iran, Lithuania, Hungary, and Sweden; and some other countries to a limited extent.

Examples for the 9th of November 2003:
2003-11-09: the standard Internet date/time format, a profile of the international standard ISO 8601, orders the components of a date like this, and additionally uses leading zeros, for example, 1996-05-01, to be easily read and sorted by computers. It is used with UTC in RFC 3339. This format is also favored in certain Asian countries, mainly East Asian countries, as well as in some European countries. The big-endian convention is also frequently used in Canada, but all three conventions are used there (both endians and the American MMDDYYYY format are allowed on Canadian bank cheques provided that the layout of the cheque makes it clear which style is to be used).
 2003 November 9
 2003Nov9 or 2003Nov09
 2003-Nov-9 or 2003-Nov-09
 2003-Nov-9, Sunday
 2003.  9. – The official format in Hungary, point after year and day, month name with small initial. Following shorter formats also can be used: 2003. . 9., 2003. 11. 9., 2003. XI. 9.
 2003.11.9 using dots and no leading zeros, common in China.
 2003.11.09
 2003/11/09 using slashes and leading zeros, common in Internet in Japan.
 2003/11/9
 03/11/09
 20031109 : the "basic format" profile of ISO 8601, an 8-digit number providing monotonic date codes, common in computing and increasingly used in dated computer file names. It is used in the standard iCalendar file format defined in RFC 5545. A big advantage of the ISO 8601 "basic format" is that a simple textual sort is equivalent to a sort by date.

It is also extended through the universal big-endian format clock time: 9 November 2003, 18h 14m 12s, or 2003/11/9/18:14:12 or (ISO 8601) 2003-11-09T18:14:12.

Gregorian, month–day–year (MDY)

This sequence is used primarily in the Philippines and the United States. It is also used to varying extents in Canada (though never in Quebec). This date format was commonly used alongside the little-endian form in the United Kingdom until the mid-20th century and can be found in both defunct and modern print media such as the London Gazette and The Times, respectively. This format was also commonly used by several English-language print media in many former British colonies and also one of two formats commonly used in India during British Raj era until the mid-20th century. In the United States, it is said as of Sunday, November 9, for example, although usage of "the" isn't uncommon (e.g. Sunday, November the 9th, and even November the 9th, Sunday, are also possible and readily understood).

 Thursday, November 9, 2006
 November 9, 2006
 Nov 9, 2006
 Nov-9-2006
 Nov-09-2006
 11/9/2006 or 11/09/2006
 11-09-2006 or 11-9-2006
 11.09.2006 or 11.9.2006
 11.09.06
 11/09/06

The modern convention is to avoid using the ordinal (th, st, rd, nd) form of numbers when the day follows the month (July 4 or July 4, 2006).  The ordinal was common in the past and is still sometimes used ([the] 4th [of] July or July 4th).

Gregorian, year–day–month (YDM)
This date format is used in Kazakhstan, Latvia, Nepal, and Turkmenistan. According to the official rules of documenting dates by governmental authorities, the long date format in Kazakh is written in the year–day–month order, e.g. 2006 5 April.

Standards
There are several standards that specify date formats:
 ISO 8601 Data elements and interchange formats – Information interchange – Representation of dates and times specifies YYYY-MM-DD (the separators are optional, but only hyphens are allowed to be used), where all values are fixed length numeric, but also allows YYYY-DDD, where DDD is the ordinal number of the day within the year, e.g. 2001–365.
 RFC 3339 Date and Time on the Internet: Timestamps specifies YYYY-MM-DD, i.e. a particular subset of the options allowed by ISO 8601.
 RFC 5322 Internet Message Format specifies day month year where day is one or two digits, month is a three letter month abbreviation, and year is four digits.

Usage overloading
Many numerical forms can create confusion when used in international correspondence, particularly when abbreviating the year to its final two digits, with no context.

For example, "07/08/06" could refer to either 7 August 2006 or July 8, 2006 (or 1906, or the sixth year of any century), or 2007 August 6, and even in some extremely rare cases it could mean 2007 8 June. In the United States, dates are rarely written in purely numerical forms in formal writing, although they are very common elsewhere; when numerical forms are used, the month appears first. In the United Kingdom, while it is regarded as acceptable albeit less common to write month-name day, year, this order is never used when written numerically. However, as an exception, the American shorthand "9/11" is widely understood as referring to the September 11, 2001 terrorist attacks.

When numbers are used to represent months, a significant amount of confusion can arise from the ambiguity of a date order; especially when the numbers representing the day, month, or year are low, it can be impossible to tell which order is being used. This can be clarified by using four digits to represent years, and naming the month; for example, "Feb" instead of "02". The ISO 8601 date order with four-digit years: YYYY-MM-DD (introduced in ISO 2014), is specifically chosen to be unambiguous. The ISO 8601 standard also has the advantage of being language independent and is therefore useful when there may be no language context and a universal application is desired (expiration dating on export products, for example). Many Internet sites use YYYY-MM-DD, and those using other conventions often use -MMM- for the month to further clarify and avoid ambiguity (2001-MAY-09, 9-MAY-2001, MAY 09 2001, etc.).

In addition, the International Organization for Standardization considers its ISO 8601 standard to make sense from a logical perspective. Mixed units, for example, feet and inches, or hours and minutes, are normally written with the largest unit first, in decreasing order. Numbers are also written in that order, so the digits of 2006 indicate, in order, the millennium, the century within the millennium, the decade within the century, and the year within the decade. The only date order that is consistent with these well-established conventions is year–month–day. A plain text list of dates with this format can be easily sorted by file managers, word processors, spreadsheets, and other software tools with built-in sorting functions. Some database systems use an eight-digit YYYYMMDD representation to handle date values. Naming folders with YYYY-MM-DD at the beginning allows them to be listed in date order when sorting by name – especially useful for organizing document libraries.

An early U.S. Federal Information Processing Standard recommended 2-digit years. This is now widely recognized as extremely problematic, because of the year 2000 problem. Some U.S. government agencies now use ISO 8601 with 4-digit years.

When transitioning from one date notation to another, people often write both styles; for example Old Style and New Style dates in the transition from the Julian to the Gregorian calendar.

Advantages for ordering in sequence
One of the advantages of using the ISO 8601 date format is that the lexicographical order (ASCIIbetical) of the representations is equivalent to the chronological order of the dates, assuming that all dates are in the same time zone. Thus dates can be sorted using simple string comparison algorithms, and indeed by any left to right collation. For example:

 2003-02-28 (28 February 2003) sorts before
 2006-03-01 (1 March 2006) which sorts before
 2015-01-30 (30 January 2015)

The YYYY-MM-DD layout is the only common format that can provide this. Sorting other date representations involves some parsing of the date strings. This also works when a time in 24-hour format is included after the date, as long as all times are understood to be in the same time zone.

ISO 8601 is used widely where concise, human-readable yet easily computable and unambiguous dates are required, although many applications store dates internally as UNIX time and only convert to ISO 8601 for display. It is worth noting that all modern computer Operating Systems retain date information of files outside of their titles, allowing the user to choose which format they prefer and have them sorted thus, irrespective of the files' names.

Specialized usage

Day and year only

The U.S. military sometimes uses a system, which they call "Julian date format" that indicates the year and the actual day out of the 365 days of the year (and thus a designation of the month would not be needed). For example, "11 December 1999" can be written in some contexts as "1999345" or "99345", for the 345th day of 1999. This system is most often used in US military logistics since it simplifies the process of calculating estimated shipping and arrival dates. For example: say a tank engine takes an estimated 35 days to ship by sea from the US to South Korea. If the engine is sent on 06104 (Friday, 14 April 2006), it should arrive on 06139 (Friday, 19 May). Note that outside of the US military and some US government agencies, including the Internal Revenue Service, this format is usually referred to as "ordinal date", rather than "Julian date".

Such ordinal date formats are also used by many computer programs (especially those for mainframe systems). Using a three-digit Julian day number saves one byte of computer storage over a two-digit month plus two-digit day, for example, "January 17" is 017 in Julian versus 0117 in month-day format. OS/390 or its successor, z/OS, display dates in yy.ddd format for most operations.

UNIX time stores time as a number in seconds since the beginning of the UNIX Epoch (1970-01-01).

Another "ordinal" date system ("ordinal" in the sense of advancing in value by one as the date advances by one day) is in common use in astronomical calculations and referencing and uses the same name as this "logistics" system. The continuity of representation of period regardless of the time of year being considered is highly useful to both groups of specialists. The astronomers describe their system as also being a "Julian date" system.

Week number used

Companies in Europe often use year, week number, and day for planning purposes.

An ISO week-numbering year has 52 or 53 full weeks. That is 364 or 371 days instead of the conventional Gregorian year of 365 or 366 days. These 53 week years occur on all years that have Thursday as the 1st of January and on leap years that start on Wednesday the 1st. The extra week is sometimes referred to as a 'leap week', although ISO 8601 does not use this term.

Expressing dates in spoken English
In English-language  outside North America (mostly in Anglophone Europe and some countries in Australasia), full dates are written as 7 December 1941 (or 7th December 1941) and spoken as "the seventh of December, nineteen forty-one" (exceedingly common usage of "the" and "of"), with the occasional usage of December 7, 1941 ("December the seventh, nineteen forty-one"). In common with most continental European usage, however, all-numeric dates are invariably ordered dd/mm/yyyy.

In Canada and the United States, the usual written form is December 7, 1941, spoken as "December seventh, nineteen forty-one" or colloquially "December the seventh, nineteen forty-one". Ordinal numerals, however, are not always used when writing and pronouncing dates, and "December seven, nineteen forty-one" is also an accepted pronunciation of the date written December 7, 1941. A notable exception to this rule is the Fourth of July (U.S. Independence Day).

See also
 Calendar algorithms
 Date and time representation by country
 Date and time notation in the United Kingdom
 Date and time notation in the United States
 Internationalization and localization
 ISO 8601 – an international standard covering the representation of dates and times
 List of calendars
 Time formatting and storage bugs
 Year 10,000 problem

Notes

References

External links
 IETF: 
 The ISO 8601 Date Format
 
 
 : Y10K and Beyond
 Today's date (Gregorian) in over 400 more-or-less obscure foreign languages

Date